Crepis pleurocarpa is a North American species of flowering plant in the family Asteraceae known by the common name nakedstem hawksbeard. It is native to the western United States (Washington, Oregon, northern California and western Nevada.

Crepis pleurocarpa grows in dry, wooded or open habitat, sometimes on serpentine soils. It is a taprooted perennial herb producing a branching stem up to 60 centimeters (24 inches) in height. The mostly lance-shaped leaves are lobed and long near the base of the plant, approaching 30 centimeters (12 inches) in length, and smaller and sometimes unlobed farther up the stem. The inflorescence is an open array of many flower heads, each with pointed phyllaries with thick midribs and thinner, hair-lined edges. Each flower head has 5 to 8 golden yellow ray florets but no disc florets. The fruit is a narrow, ribbed achene with a whitish pappus.

References

External links
Calflora Database: Crepis pleurocarpa (Naked stemmed hawksbeard)
Jepson Manual eFlora (TJM2) treatment of Crepis pleurocarpa
USDA Plants Profile for Crepis pleurocarpa (nakedstem hawksbeard)
UC CalPhotos gallery of Crepis pleurocarpa

pleurocarpa
Flora of California
Flora of Nevada
Flora of Oregon
Flora of the Klamath Mountains
Flora of the Sierra Nevada (United States)
Natural history of the California Coast Ranges
Plants described in 1882
Taxa named by Asa Gray
Flora without expected TNC conservation status